The Princess of Patches is a 1917 American silent drama film directed by Alfred E. Green and starring Violet De Biccari, Vivian Reed and Burke Wilbur.

Cast
 Violet De Biccari as The Princess of Patches 
 Vivian Reed as The Princess of Patches 
 Burke Wilbur as Jack Merry 
 Hildor Hoberg as Colonel Silverthorne 
 Roy Southerland as Lee Silverthorne 
 Cora Lambert as Juliet 
 Frank Weed as Waggles 
 Charles Le Moyne as Judas 
 Maude Baker as Liza Biggs 
 R.H. Kelly as The Sheriff

References

Bibliography
James Robert Parish & Michael R. Pitts. Film directors: a guide to their American films. Scarecrow Press, 1974.

External links
 

1917 films
1917 drama films
1910s English-language films
American silent feature films
Silent American drama films
American black-and-white films
Films directed by Alfred E. Green
1910s American films